Seatoller is a settlement in Borrowdale in the English Lake District. Historically part of Cumberland, it lies on the B5289 road at the east foot of the Honister Pass, and to the south of Derwent Water.

Seatoller was the destination of a regular walkers bus in the 1960s and 1970s which left Carlisle each Sunday at 07:30 giving access by public transport into the heart of the lakes.

The hamlet consists of a farmhouse, two bed and breakfasts, a tea shop and two rows of cottages.

Governance
Seatoller is within the Copeland UK Parliamentary constituency.  Trudy Harrison is the Member of Parliament.

Before Brexit for the European Parliament its residents voted to elect MEP's for the North West England constituency.

For Local Government purposes it is in the Keswick Ward of Allerdale Borough Council and the Keswick Division of Cumbria County Council.

Seatoller has its own Parish Council; Borrowdale Parish Council.

See also

Listed buildings in Borrowdale

References

Hamlets in Cumbria
Allerdale